Jamshidabad may refer to:

Gilan Province
Jamshidabad, Gilan, a village in Rudbar County

Hamdan Province
Jamshidabad, Hamadan

Kerman Province
Jamshidabad, Kerman, a village in Anar County

Lorestan Province
Jamshidabad, Delfan, Lorestan Province, Iran
Jamshidabad, Qaleh-ye Mozaffari, a village in Qaleh-ye Mozaffari Rural District, Central District, Selseleh County, Lorestan Province, Iran
Jamshidabad, Yusefvand, a village in Yusefvand Rural District, Central District, Selseleh County, Lorestan Province, Iran
Jamshidabad-e Heydar, Khorramabad County, Lorestan Province, Iran
Jamshidabad-e Mirza, Khorramabad County, Lorestan Province, Iran

Markazi Province
Jamshidabad, Markazi

Mazandaran Province
Jamshidabad, Mazandaran, a village in Amol County

South Khorasan Province
Jamshidabad, South Khorasan, a village in Khusf County